Mihály Ibrányi (born 3 December 1895, Debrecen, Austro-Hungarian Empire – died 19 October 1962, Budapest, Hungary) was a Hungarian officer during World War II. He commanded the Hungarian First Cavalry Division and V Corps.

Awards
 Iron Cross - 2nd and 1st Class - 1939
 Knight's Cross of the Iron Cross - 26 November 1944

References

 
 

1895 births
1962 deaths
Hungarian generals
Hungarian military personnel of World War II
Recipients of the Knight's Cross of the Iron Cross
Military personnel from Budapest
People from Debrecen